

The gasoline-powered Oldsmobile Model R, also known as the Curved Dash Oldsmobile, is credited as being the first mass-produced automobile, meaning that it was built on an assembly line using interchangeable parts. It was introduced by the Oldsmobile company in 1901 and produced through 1903; 425 were produced the first year, 2,500 in 1902, and over 19,000 were built in all. When General Motors assumed operations from Ransom E. Olds on November 12, 1908, GM introduced the Oldsmobile Model 20, which was the 1908 Buick Model 10 with a stretched wheelbase and minor exterior changes.

It was a runabout model, could seat two passengers, and sold for US$650 ($ in  dollars). While competitive, due to high volume, and priced below the US$850 two-seat Ford Model C "Doctor's Car", it was more expensive than the Western 1905 Gale Model A roadster at US$500. The Black sold for $375, and the Success for US$250. It was built as a city car for short distance driving, while the larger Model S could carry four passengers and could travel longer distances.

The flat-mounted, water-cooled, single-cylinder engine, situated at the center of the car, produced , relying on a brass gravity feed carburetor. The transmission was a semiautomatic design with two forward speeds and one reverse. The low-speed forward and reverse gear system is a planetary type (epicyclic).

The car's success was partially by accident; in 1901, a fire destroyed a number of other prototypes before they could be approved for production, leaving the Curved Dash as the only one intact. As workers were attempting to move the prototypes out of the burning building, they were only successful at rescuing one prototype, the Model R Curved Dash.

In 1904, the Model R was replaced by the Model 6C, which had a larger 1,931 cc engine, drum brakes replaced the band brake. After 2,234 copies, the 6C model was discontinued in December 1904.

In 1905, the Model B was introduced with more improvements. The engine received improved cooling and a new flywheel, and the handbrake now worked on the differential instead of the gearbox. The leaf spring suspension was modified so that the reinforced axles were connected to all spring elements. In 1906, the car received celluloid side window curtains. The dashboard was also offered with an upright position, called the Straight Dash, and approximately 6,500 Model B were manufactured, and the Model F was introduced in 1907, again with mechanical improvements. 

The Model B also saw a limited production Touring Sedan with a novel entry approach called the Side Entrance Touring Sedan where passengers would enter from the middle of the car. The engine was a  two cylinder horizontally opposed engine installed underneath the passenger compartment that powered the rear wheels, and the transmission was a two-speed planetary gearbox. Sales weren't successful and it was cancelled by 1906.

Oldsmobile Pirate Beach Racer

In 1902, Mr. Olds modified a Model R and essentially stripped it down to an engine, a single seat, a radiator and connected the solid front and rear axles on semi-elliptic leaf springs, which then supported the engine, transmission and passenger. He then raced it at Florida's Ormond Beach in 1902 and 1903, where his driver Horace Thomas drove the Pirate to a record speed of 54.38 mph.

Gallery

Notes

References
 
 Frank Leslie's Popular Monthly (January, 1904)

External links

 The Curved Dash Oldsmobile at The Henry Ford Museum
 1905 Oldsmobile Image (Suffolk County(NY) Historical Society Museum)
  – large 1951 article on a 1904 Olds making a coast to coast trip with detailed photo of subject

Curved Dash
First car made by manufacturer
Cars introduced in 1901
1900s cars
Veteran vehicles
Rear_mid-engine,_rear-wheel-drive_vehicles